Trametal was founded in 1985 in Genova, Italy with production sites in San Giorgio di Nogaro, as a limited liability company whose main business concerned in brokerage and trading of steel products, particularly spare parts for steel plants. In 1969 the company changed its corporate form to a private limited company, renamed Trametal spa. In January 2008, Metinvest Holding LLC bought Trametal spa together with Spartan UK Ltd.

References

External links
 Metinvest Trametal SpA
 Metinvest 

Metinvest
Steel companies of Italy
Italian companies established in 1985